Rosa 'Charlotte Brownwell'   is a yellow-blend Hybrid tea rose cultivar, bred by American rose breeder, Dr. Walter, Brownwell, before 1971. The rose is part of a series, the Brownwell family developed to withstand the sub-zero temperatures of winter in Rhode Island.

Description
'Charlotte Brownwell' is a medium, bushy, spreading Hybrid tea rose,  in height, with a  spread.  Its flowers are large in size, with a high-centered, globular, double (17-25 petals) bloom form. Flower color is a light yellow with pink edges. 'Charlotte Brownwell' blooms are carried mostly singly or in small clusters throughout the season. Leaves are glossy and medium green. The plant is a very vigorous grower.

History
Rosa 'Charlotte Brownwell' is a Hybrid tea rose created by American rose breeder, Dr. Walter D. Brownell in Little Compton, Rhode Island. He and his wife, Josephine, and their son, H.C. developed hardy sub-zero roses  from the 1920s to the 1950s, to survive and flourish in Rhode Island's frigid winters. Brownwell developed 'Charlotte Brownwell' by crossing and unnamed seedling and 'Peace'.

References

Charlotte Brownwell
1971 introductions